Dyal Singh College is a co-educational institute of University of Delhi. It was established in 1959 in Delhi, India. It offers undergraduate as well as postgraduate courses in science, the humanities and commerce.

It has been ranked 21st all over India in the national institutional ranking framework in 2020. In the year 2021, it secured 29th place in the college category, while in 2022 it got 35th place.

Dyal Singh College has been awarded "A" grade by the National assessment and accreditation council in the year 2017. The college admits students from all communities irrespective of gender, caste, religion and physical challenges.

Location
The college is centrally located at Lodhi Road in New Delhi near Lodhi Gardens, Jawaharlal Nehru Stadium, Safdarjung Tomb, Humayun's Tomb, India Habitat Centre, India International Centre and many other institutions of national and international significance. The college is surrounded by prominent and splendid neighbourhoods, markets and societies as Khan Market, Golf Links, Jor Bagh, Rabindra Nagar, Delhi Golf Club, Delhi Race Club and so on. It is often regarded as the most beautiful college of DU. It is next to Jawahar Lal Nehru Stadium Metro Station on the Violet Line of the Delhi Metro. The college has connectivity through buses of the Delhi Transport Corporation and Delhi Metro.

History
The college's origin arose from the estate of Sardar Dyal Singh Majithia, founder of The Tribune and Punjab National Bank, who willed his estate in 1895 for the establishment of an educational trust for a secular college. Consequently, Dyal Singh College was established at Lahore in 1910. After the Partition of India, Dyal Singh College was established in Karnal and Delhi. It started functioning in the capital at Rouse Avenue as a constituent college of the University of Delhi w.e.f 5 August 1959 and at present location since 16 October 1962. It was taken over by the University of Delhi as a university maintained institution in 1978.

Departments
The college currently has the following departments.
Bengali
Botany
Chemistry
Commerce
Computer science
Economics
English
Geography
Hindi
History
Mathematics
Philosophy
Physical Education
Physics
Political science
Punjabi
Urdu
Zoology

Ranking

Dyal Singh College is ranked 10th among colleges in India by the National Institutional Ranking Framework in 2020.

Notable alumni
Alka Lamba, Former member of Delhi legislative assembly
Anil Chaudhary, former member of Delhi legislative assembly, president of Delhi Pradesh Congress Committee
Dr. Govind Singh, Associate Professor at O.P. Jindal Global University, and Director, Delhi Greens.
Pankaj Singh, Member of Uttar Pradesh legislative assembly
Priyanka Kothari, Indian actress 
Rajvir Singh, former Indian wushu player 
Sandeep Kumar, Indian politician
Sehban Azim, Indian actor
Shruti Choudhry, former member of Parliament (Lok Sabha)
Sheikh Noorul Hassan, member of Manipur legislative assembly

See also
Education in India
Literacy in India
List of institutions of higher education in Delhi

References

External links
 

Delhi University
Universities and colleges in Delhi
Educational institutions established in 1959
1959 establishments in Delhi